Berkshire College of Agriculture is a further education agricultural college at Hall Place in Burchetts Green, Maidenhead, Berkshire. It was founded in 1949, as the Berkshire Institute of Agriculture.

Courses
The college was built to provide a training centre for agricultural workers. It has expanded to offer work with animals and construction.

Catchment area
As this is a further education college, there is no legal catchment area, but its rural location causes an extensive bus service to be run to many towns and villages including Amersham, Beaconsfield, Bushey, Bracknell, Camberley, The Chalfonts, Gerrards Cross, Great Missenden, Henley, High Wycombe, Maidenhead, Reading, Rickmansworth, Slough, Thame, Uxbridge, Wallingford, Windsor, Watford and Wokingham.

References

External links
 
 Official website

Agricultural universities and colleges in the United Kingdom
Further education colleges in Berkshire
Educational institutions established in 1949
Education in the Royal Borough of Windsor and Maidenhead
1949 establishments in England
Hurley, Berkshire